The Kálmán Makláry Fine Arts gallery is a showcase for artists of the Post-War School of Paris. The gallery is a member of Syndicat National des Antiquaires Négociants en objets d'Art Tableaux anciens et modernes de France.

Exhibitions

2013 
 Hur Kyung-Ae: recent works - one-man show
 Judit Reigl: Abstract Expressionism - exhibition from the Outburst series, 1955–1957
 Kamill Major: recent works - one-man show
 Francois Fiedler: works from 1945-65 - one-man show

2012 
 Hur Kyung-Ae - recent paintings - one-man show
 Fiedler & Hargittai
 Géza Szóbel: one-man show
 Hantai-Reigl-Fiedler: Gestural paintings from the 50-60's
 Antal Bíró: one-man show - works from 1955–65

2011 
 Hur Kyung-Ae: one-man show
 Kamill Major: one-man show
 Judit Reigl - recent works on paper
 Simon Hantai: one-man show
 Tibor Csernus: one-man show
 Étienne Sándorfi: one-man show

2010 
 Kamill Major: one-man show
 Gustave Miklós - Joseph Csaky: sculptures (with catalog)
 Paul Kallos: one-man show
 Étienne Sándorfi: one-man show

2009 
 Kamill Major: one-man show (with catalog)
 Judit Reigl - series progress - Works from 1974-1988 (with catalog)
 Sam Havadtoy: one-man show (with catalog)
 Gabor Mezey: one-man show

2008 
 Simon Hantai: Hommage exhibition
 Endre Balint: one-man show
 Etienne Beöthy: sculptures
 Judit Reigl: series Man - works from 1961-1973 (with catalog)

2007 
 Robert Marcel: recent photographs - one-man show (with catalog)
 Lucien & Rodolf Hervé: Hommage exhibition (with catalog)
 Judit Reigl - Simon Hantai: works from the 50-60's
 Tibor Csernus: one-man show (with catalog)
 Béla Czóbel: one-man show (with catalog)
 Modernism II: Moholy-Nagy & André Kertész(with catalog)

2006 
 Étienne Sándorfi: one-man show (with catalog)
 Modernism: collection from Masters of the Hungarian Avant Garde and Modernism (with catalog)
 Master Drawings: collection from Masters of the Hungarian Avant Garde and Modernism

2005 
 Opening exhibition - Huns in Paris
 Judit Reigl: early works, paintings from 1950–60
 Alfred Reth: one-man show

Exhibitions with other institutions

2010 
 Judit Reigl - retrospective exhibition in Modem

2007 
 Étienne Sándorfi - retrospective exhibition in Modem

2005 
 Judit Reigl: retrospective exhibition in Műcsarnok

2003 
 Alfred Reth - Budapest Gallery, Alfred Reth - Institut Hongrois

Art Fairs 
The gallery is regularly present at the European art fairs, taking part at Art Cologne in Köln, at Salon Du Collectionneur in Paris, at Art13 London and is a returning exhibitor at Brafa in Brussels, and at Art Paris. In 2010, the Biennale Des Antiquaires in Paris invited them to the Tremplin (Springboard) section, introducing the best new galleries. In spring of 2012, the European Fine Art Foundation (TEFAF), celebrating a 25th anniversary of its Maastricht far, selected the gallery among the world’s six most promising young art dealers, to introduce themselves within the Showcase framework at TEFAF. In autumn of 2012, the gallery represented its artists with an independent stand at the Paris Biennale.

2013 
 Brafa - 58th Brussels Antiques and Fine Art Fair
 Art13 London - 1st Modern and Contemporary Art Fair
 Art Paris - Modern and Contemporary Art Fair
 Art Show - Busan
 KIAF - Korean International Art Fair

2012 
 Brafa - 57th Brussels Antiques and Fine Art Fair
 TEFAF - Showcase
 Art Paris - Modern and Contemporary Art Fair
 Biennale des Antiquaries

2011 
 Brafa - 56th Brussels Antiques and Fine Art Fair

2010 
 Brafa - 55th Brussels Antiques and Fine Art Fair
 Art Paris - Modern and Contemporary Art Fair
 Biennale des Antiquaries - Tremplin pour la Biennale
 Budapest Art Fair

2009 
 Brafa - 54th Brussels Antiques and Fine Art Fair
 Budapest Art Fair
 Art Paris - Modern and Contemporary Art Fair

2008 
 Art Cologne
 Art Paris - Modern and Contemporary Art Fair
 The Moscow World Fine Art Fair
 Budapest Art Fair
 PLUG Contemporary - Etienne Sandorfi: one-man show

2007 
 Le Salon Du Collectionneurs
 Budapest Art Fair
 PLUG Contemporary - Judit Reigl: one-man show

2006 
 Budapest Art Fair
 PLUG Contemporary - Judit Reigl: one-man show

2005 
 Antik Enterior

Books and catalogs 

 Simon Hantai Vol. I-II. Text by Agnes Berecz (IN GIFT BOX). Hardcover-spiral: 680 pages. Vol. I. Publisher: Kalman Maklary Fine Arts Ltd.; 1st ed. (2012). .  Vol. II. Publisher: Kalman Maklary Fine Arts Ltd.; 1st ed. (2013). 
 Reigl Hantai Fiedler. Paperback: 36 pages. Publisher: Kalman Maklary Fine Arts Ltd. (2012).
 Major Kamill. Text by Geza Perneczky. Hardcover: 100 pages. Publisher: Maklary Artworks Ltd.; 1st ed. (2011). Language: English, French, Hungarian. 
 Judit Regil. Text by Agnes Berecz. Hardcover: 300 pages. Publisher: Kalman Maklary Fine Arts Ltd. (2010). Language: English, French, Hungarian. , 
 Joseph Csáky, Gustave Miklós. Hardcover: 116 pages. Publisher: Makláry Artworks Ltd.; 1st ed. (2010). , 
 Judit Reigl 1974-1988. Text by Marcelin Pleynet. Hardcover: 130 pages. Publisher: Maklary Artworks Ltd., Erdész & Makláry Fine Arts; 1st ed. (2009). ,  
 Judit Reigl 1961-1973. Text by Agnes Berecz. Paperback: 90 pages. Publisher: Maklary Artworks Ltd., Erdész & Makláry Fine Arts; 1st ed. (2008). Language: English, French, Hungarian. , 
 Endre Bálint. Paperback: 88 pages. Publisher: Maklary Artworks Ltd., Erdész & Makláry Fine Arts; 1st ed. (2008). Language: English. , 
 Válogatás 2007-2008. Hardcover: 104 pages. Publisher: Maklary Artworks Ltd.; 1st ed. (2007). Language: Hungarian. 
 Sándorfi. Hardcover: 352 pages. Publisher: Maklary Artworks Ltd.; 1st ed. (2007). Language: English, French, Hungarian. , 
 Robert Marcel. Paperback: 52 pages. Publisher: Maklary Artworks Ltd., Erdész & Makláry Fine Arts; 1st Ed. (2007). Language: English, French, Hungarian. 
 Lucien Hervé, Rudolf Hervé. Paperback: 56 pages. Publisher: Maklary Artworks Ltd., Erdész & Makláry Fine Arts; 1st Ed. Edition (2007). Language: English, French, Hungarian. 
 Tibor Csernus. Text By Gabor Lajta. Paperback: 72 pages. Publisher: Maklary Artworks Ltd. 1st Ed. Edition (2007). Language: English, French, Hungarian. 
 László Moholy-Nagy and André Kertész. Paperback: 44 pages. Publisher: Erdész & Makláry Fine Arts; 1st Ed. Edition (2007). Language: Hungarian. 
 Bela Czobel. Text by Gergely Barki. Paperback: 52 pages. Publisher: Erdész & Makláry Fine Arts; 1st Ed. Edition (2007). Language: English, French, Hungarian. 
 Judit Reigl (1950s). Text by Agnes Berecz. Paperback: 68 pages. Publisher: Maklary Artworks Ltd., Erdész & Makláry Fine Arts; 1st ed. (2006). Language: English, French, Hungarian. , .
 Sándorfi. Hardcover: 52 pages. Publisher: Maklary Artworks Ltd.; 1st ed. (2006). Language: Hungarian. 
 Modernizmus. Paperback: 40 pages. Publisher: Erdész & Makláry Fine Arts; 1st Ed. Edition (2006). Language: Hungarian. 
 Odon Marffy. Text by Zoltan Rockenbauer. Hardcover: 476 pages. Publisher: Maklary Artworks Ltd.; 1st ed. (2006). Language: English, French, Hungarian. 
 Alfréd Réth. Hardcover: 344 pages. Publisher: Maklary Artworks Ltd.; 1st ed. (2003). Language: English, French, Hungarian. ,

Videos

Videos about artists

Videos about art fairs

References

Art galleries established in 2005
Art museums and galleries in Hungary
Culture in Budapest